Cebrennus is a genus of huntsman spiders that was first described by Eugène Louis Simon in 1880. It is considered a senior synonym of Cerbalopsis.

The Moroccan flic-flac spider (C. rechenbergi), that uses a flic-flac motion to escape threats, was first described in 2014.

Species
 it contains nineteen species, found in Africa, Asia, on Malta, and in Spain:
Cebrennus aethiopicus Simon, 1880 – Egypt, Ethiopia, Eritrea, Sudan, Djibouti, Saudi Arabia
Cebrennus atlas Jäger, 2014 – Morocco
Cebrennus castaneitarsis Simon, 1880 – Algeria to Israel
Cebrennus concolor (Denis, 1947) – Egypt
Cebrennus cultrifer Fage, 1921 – Algeria
Cebrennus flagellatus Jäger, 2014 – Afghanistan
Cebrennus intermedius Jäger, 2000 – Saudi Arabia
Cebrennus kochi (O. Pickard-Cambridge, 1872) – Syria, Israel
Cebrennus laurae Jäger, 2014 – Canary Is.
Cebrennus logunovi Jäger, 2000 – Turkmenistan
Cebrennus mayri Jäger, 2000 – Oman
Cebrennus powelli Fage, 1921 – Morocco
Cebrennus rambodjavani Moradmand, Zamani & Jäger, 2016 – Iran
Cebrennus rechenbergi Jäger, 2014 – Morocco
Cebrennus rungsi Jäger, 2000 – Morocco
Cebrennus sumer Al-Khazali & Jäger, 2019 – Iraq
Cebrennus tunetanus Simon, 1885 – Tunisia
Cebrennus villosus (Jézéquel & Junqua, 1966) – Algeria, Tunisia
Cebrennus wagae (Simon, 1874) (type) – Malta, Algeria, Tunisia, Libya

See also
 List of Sparassidae species

References

Araneomorphae genera
Sparassidae
Spiders of Africa
Spiders of Asia